Giorgio Baldizzone (born 27 May 1946 in Asti, Piedmont, Italy) is an Italian entomologist who specialises in the study of Microlepidoptera.  Baldizzone is a past president of the Piedmonte and Valle d’Aosta chapter of the World Wide Fund for Nature.

References

Living people
Italian entomologists
University of Turin alumni
1946 births